WMHS (88.1 FM, "EDge Radio") is a high school radio station licensed to serve Pike Creek, Delaware, United States. The station is owned by the Red Clay Consolidated School District and operated by the students of Thomas McKean High School. It airs a variety radio format.

The station has been assigned these call letters by the Federal Communications Commission since January 12, 2000.

See also
List of community radio stations in the United States

References

External links
 

MHS
Community radio stations in the United States
High school radio stations in the United States
Variety radio stations in the United States